The Wetterspitzen are three of the rocky peaks on a mountain ridge in the Wetterstein mountains in the central part of the Eastern Alps in Germany. They lie two kilometres, as the crow flies, southwest of Germany's highest peak, the Zugspitze, on the border between the Austrian province of Tyrol and the German state of Bavaria. The Wetterspitzen form the southwest perimeter of the Zugspitze ledge (Zugspitzplatt); below and to the east is the ski region on the Schneeferner with its research station, the Schneefernerhaus.

The three peaks are the: 

Base 
A possible base for climbing the Wetterspitzen is the SonnAlpin restaurant on the Zugspitze Ledge, the terminal station of the Bavarian Zugspitze Rack Railway.

Easiest routes 
From the Zugspitze ledge (Zugspitzplatt): 
 an easy climb, according to the literature, (UIAA grade II) in half an hour to the Northern Wetterspitze.
 in two hours (UIAA II) to the Middle Wetterspitze,
 in half an hour with any difficult sections (UIAA I) to the Eastern Wetterspitze
In addition there are various climbing routes up to UIAA grade V, starting from west of Ehrwald.

Sources and maps 
 Stefan Beulke: AVF Wetterstein, Rother Verlag München (1996), 
 Alpenvereinskarte 1:25.000, Blatt 4/2, Wetterstein- und Mieminger Gebirge

Mountains of the Alps
Mountains of Bavaria
Mountains of Tyrol (state)
Wetterstein
Two-thousanders of Austria
Two-thousanders of Germany